Razak Abalora (born 4 September 1996) is a Ghanaian professional footballer who plays for the Moldovan National Division team Sheriff Tiraspol as a goalkeeper. He joined the club from Tanzanian side Azam F.C. on a free transfer.

Club career
Abalora joined the Feyenoord Academy and went on to spend three years before joining the senior team now called West African Football Academy (WAFA). Abalora spent the next five years at the Ghanaian Premier League team before he moved to Azam. He joined Azam on a three-year deal in July 2017.

In October 2020, he joined Asante Kotoko on as a free agent on 3-year contract. He made his debut on 20 December 2020, in a 1–0 victory over Dreams. He was appointed the deputy captain of the club to Ismail Abdul-Ganiyu. He left the club in 2022 and joined Sheriff Tiraspol. He played 33 league matches and kept 17 clean sheets.

In January 2022, Abalora joined Moldovan football club Sheriff Tiraspol on a three-year contract. This made him the fourth Ghanaian player to join the club in the space of two years.

International career
Razak earned his first cap for Ghana on 19 October 2019. The call up was for the 2021 African Cup of Nations qualifying matches against South Africa, São Tomé and Príncipe.

Honours
Azam FC

 Tanzania FA Cup: 2018–19

Kagame Interclub Cup: 2018
Mapinduzi Cup: 2018,2019
Asante Kotoko

 Ghana Premier League: 2021–22

Sheriff Tiraspol

 Moldovan National Division: 2021–22
 Moldovan Cup: 2021–22

Individual
 Azam Best Player Award: 2017–18, 2018–19, 2019–20

References

External links

1996 births
Living people
Ghanaian footballers
Ghana under-20 international footballers
Ghanaian expatriate footballers
Association football goalkeepers
Footballers from Accra
Ghana Premier League players
Moldovan Super Liga players
Azam F.C. players
Asante Kotoko S.C. players
Ghana international footballers
Ghanaian expatriate sportspeople in Tanzania
Ghanaian expatriate sportspeople in Moldova
Expatriate footballers in Tanzania
Expatriate footballers in Moldova